Jean Taris, Swimming Champion ( or Taris, roi de l'eau or Taris, champion de natation) is a 1931 French short documentary film directed by Jean Vigo, about the French swimmer Jean Taris. The film is notable for the many innovative techniques that Vigo uses, including close ups and freeze frames of the swimmer's body.

At the end of 1930, Vigo was commissioned by the Gaumont Film Company to direct a short film about swimming, centred on the French champion Jean Taris. Most of the film was shot at the Automobile Club de France, where the swimming pool had glass portholes through which underwater shots could be taken.

In the film’s 56 shots, Vigo fulfils his commission by concentrating mainly on a demonstration of the crawl. However, he also introduces several unexpected and avant-garde effects, including a woman practising swimming strokes while lying flat on a stool out of the pool, with a life guard in attendance; slow motion underwater shots; a dive and a jump run backwards, so the swimmer flies out of the water; and Taris’s swimsuit dissolving to be replaced by a suit, overcoat and hat, in which he walks across the water.

Although Vigo disliked the final film he was struck by the underwater shots, especially the strange image of a man’s head under water. He reused that image in his later film L'Atalante.

References

Bibliography

External links 
 

1930s French-language films
1930s short documentary films
1931 documentary films
1931 films
Black-and-white documentary films
Documentary films about sportspeople
Films directed by Jean Vigo
French black-and-white films
French short documentary films
Swimming films
1930s French films